Christ Church (the temple or house, ædēs, of Christ, and thus sometimes known as "The House") is a constituent college of the University of Oxford in England. Founded in 1546 by King Henry VIII, the college is uniquely a joint foundation of the university and the cathedral of the Oxford diocese, Christ Church Cathedral, which both serves as the college chapel and whose dean is ex officio the college head.

The college is amongst the largest and wealthiest of colleges at the University of Oxford, with an endowment of £770m and student body of 650 in 2022. As of 2022, the college had 661 students. Its grounds contain a number of architecturally significant buildings including Tom Tower (designed by Sir Christopher Wren), Tom Quad (the largest quadrangle in Oxford), and the Great Dining Hall, which was the seat of the parliament assembled by King Charles I during the English Civil War. The buildings have inspired replicas throughout the world in addition to being featured in films such as Harry Potter and The Golden Compass, helping Christ Church become the most popular Oxford college for tourists with almost half a million visitors annually.

The college's alumni include 13 British prime ministers out of the 30 educated at Oxford (the highest number of any college at Oxford or Cambridge), as well as former prime ministers of Pakistan and Ceylon. Other notable alumni include King Edward VII, King William II of the Netherlands, the founder of Pennsylvania, William Penn, seventeen archbishops, writers Lewis Carroll (author of Alice in Wonderland) and W. H. Auden, philosopher John Locke, and scientist Robert Hooke. Albert Einstein was also associated with the college. The college has several cities and places named after it.

History

In 1525, at the height of his power, Thomas Wolsey, Lord Chancellor of England and Cardinal Archbishop of York, suppressed St Frideswide's Priory in Oxford and founded Cardinal College on its lands, using funds from the dissolution of Wallingford Priory and other minor priories. He planned the establishment on a magnificent scale, but fell from grace in 1529, with the buildings only three-quarters complete, as they were to remain for 140 years.

In 1531 the college was itself suppressed, but it was refounded in 1532 as King Henry VIII's College by Henry VIII, to whom Wolsey's property had escheated. Then in 1546 the King, who had broken from the Church of Rome and acquired great wealth through the dissolution of the monasteries in England, refounded the college as Christ Church as part of the reorganisation of the Church of England, making the partially demolished priory church the cathedral of the recently created Diocese of Oxford.

Christ Church's sister college in the University of Cambridge is Trinity College, Cambridge, founded the same year by Henry VIII.  Since the time of Queen Elizabeth I the college has also been associated with Westminster School. The dean remains to this day an ex officio member of the school's governing body.

Major additions have been made to the buildings through the centuries, and Wolsey's Great Quadrangle was crowned with the famous gate-tower designed by Christopher Wren. To this day, the bell in the tower, Great Tom, is rung 101 times at 9 pm measured by Oxford time, meaning at 9:05 pm GMT/BST every night, once for each of the 100 original scholars of the college, plus one more stroke added in 1664. In former times this was done at midnight, signalling the close of all college gates throughout Oxford. Since it took 20 minutes to ring the 101, the Christ Church gates, unlike those of other colleges, did not close until 12:20 am. When the ringing was moved back to 9:00 pm, Christ Church gates still remained open until 12.20, 20 minutes later than any other college. Although the clock itself now shows GMT/BST, Christ Church still follows Oxford time in the timings of services in the cathedral.

King Charles I made the Deanery his palace and held his Parliament in the Great Hall during the English Civil War. In the evening of 29 May 1645, during the second siege of Oxford, a "bullet of IX lb. weight" shot from the Parliamentarians' warning-piece at Marston fell against the wall of the north side of the Hall.

Several of Christ Church's deans achieved high academic distinction, notably Owen under the Commonwealth, Aldrich and Fell in the Restoration period, Jackson and Gaisford in the early 19th century and Liddell in the high Victorian era.

For over four centuries Christ Church admitted men only; the first female students at Christ Church matriculated in 1980.

Organisation
Christ Church, formally titled "The Dean and Chapter of the Cathedral Church of Christ in Oxford of the Foundation of King Henry the Eighth", is the only academic institution in the world which is also a cathedral, the seat (cathedra) of the Bishop of Oxford. The Visitor of Christ Church is the reigning British sovereign (currently King Charles III), and the Bishop of Oxford is unique among English bishops in not being the Visitor of his own cathedral.

The head of the college is the Dean of Christ Church. Christ Church is unique among Oxford colleges in that its Head of House, who is head of both college and cathedral, must be an Anglican cleric appointed by the crown as dean of the cathedral church. The Dean lives on site in a grand sixteenth-century house in the main quadrangle. The college's activities are managed by a senior and a junior censor (formally titled the Censor Moralis Philosophiae and the Censor Naturalis Philosophiae) the former of whom is responsible for academic matters, the latter for undergraduate discipline. They are chosen from among the members of the governing body.  A Censor Theologiae is also appointed to act as the dean's deputy; this post is currently held by Professor Ian Watson.

The form "Christ Church College" is considered incorrect, in part because it ignores the cathedral, an integral part of the unique dual foundation.

Governing body
The governing body of Christ Church consists of the dean and chapter of the cathedral, together with the "Students of Christ Church", who are not junior members but rather the equivalent of the fellows of the other colleges. Until the later 19th century, the Students differed from fellows in that they had no governing powers in their own college, as those resided solely with the dean and chapter. The governing body of Christ Church now has around 60 members. Serving alongside the seven members of Chapter, the other members include statutory professors and associate professors with joint appointments (employed both by the University and Christ Church) as well as early-career Career Development Fellows on fixed-term contracts.  Sir John Bell and Sir Tim Berners-Lee are both members of the governing body of Christ Church.

Buildings and grounds

Christ Church sits in approximately 175 acres (71 hectares) of land. This includes the Christ Church Meadow (including Merton Field and Boathouse Island), which is open to the public all year round. In addition Christ Church own Aston's Eyot (purchased from All Souls College in 1891), Christ Church recreation ground (including the site of Liddell buildings), and School Field which has been leased to Magdalen College School since 1893. The meadow itself is inhabited by English Longhorn cattle. In October 1783 James Sadler made the first hot air balloon ascent in Britain from the meadow. The college gardens, quadrangles, and meadow are Grade I listed on the Register of Historic Parks and Gardens.

Christ Church has a number of architecturally significant buildings. These include:

Grade I listed:
 Christ Church Library
 Christ Church Cathedral
 Peckwater Quadrangle
 The Great Quadrangle or Tom Quad including:
 Tom Tower
 Great Hall
 Mercury Fountain
 Canterbury Quadrangle
 Chapter House
Grade II* listed:
 Blue Boar Quadrangle
 Christ Church Picture Gallery
Others:
 The Meadow Building (Grade II)
 The Old Library
 The Lee Building/Anatomy School (Grade II)
 Christ Church Kitchen & Scullery (Grade II)
 Old Brew House (Grade II)
 Liddell Buildings
 The Pococke Garden, named after Edward Pococke, Regius Professor of Hebrew (1648–91)

Influences 
The college buildings and grounds are the setting for parts of Evelyn Waugh's Brideshead Revisited, as well as a small part of Lewis Carroll's Alice's Adventures in Wonderland. More recently it has been used in the filming of the movies of J. K. Rowling's Harry Potter series and also the film adaptation of Philip Pullman's novel Northern Lights (the film bearing the title of the American edition of the book, The Golden Compass). Distinctive features of the college's architecture have been used as models by a number of other academic institutions, including the NUI Galway, which reproduces Tom Quad. The University of Chicago, Cornell University, and Kneuterdijk Palace have reproductions of Christ Church's dining hall (in the forms of Hutchinson Hall, the dining hall of Risley Residential College, and the Gothic hall of Kneuterdijk Palace, respectively). ChristChurch Cathedral in New Zealand, after which the City of Christchurch is named, is itself named after Christ Church, Oxford. Stained glass windows in the cathedral and other buildings are by the Pre-Raphaelite William Morris group with designs by Edward Burne-Jones.

Resident animals on grounds 
Historically, there has been a resident tortoise for the annual Oxford tortoise races. However, since 2020, due to the pandemic, there has not been a tortoise. Recently, there have been two "resident" ducks, which can be seen in Tom Quad, affectionately named "Tom" and "Peck" after two of the famous quadrangles in Christ Church. 

The Mercury fountain also houses carp, notably a large koi carp named George, which was a gift from the Empress of Japan. A heron may also be frequently seen visiting the pond as their hunting ground. This stopped, in September 2022, when the fishes were moved to a spacious lake home somewhere in Oxfordshire while the College perform essential maintenance on the pond.

Outside the Meadow Building in the Christ Church Meadow, there are also cows present during the day. The cows are of rare English Longhorn breed.

Cathedral choir 

Long associated with  High Church Anglicanism, Christ Church is unique in that it has both a cathedral choir and a college choir. The cathedral choir comprises twelve adults and sixteen boys. The adults are made up of lay clerks and choral scholars, or academical clerks. The choir was all male until 2019, when they welcomed alto Elizabeth Nurse, the first female clerk of Christ Church Cathedral Choir. The boys, whose ages range from eight to thirteen, are chosen for their musical ability and attend Christ Church Cathedral School. Aside from the director, there is also a sub-organist and two organ scholars. The college choir, however, is always a student-run society, and sings Evensong once a week in term time. In vacations the services are sung by the Cathedral Singers of Christ Church - a choir drawn from semi-professional singers in and around Oxford. The cathedral also hosts visiting choirs from time to time during vacations.Throughout its history, the cathedral choir has attracted many distinguished composers and organists - from its first director, John Taverner, appointed by Cardinal Wolsey in 1526, to William Walton. The present director of music (known as the organist), is Steven Grahl who succeeded Stephen Darlington in September 2018. In recent years, the choir have commissioned recorded works by contemporary composers such as John Tavener, William Mathias and Howard Goodall, also patron of Christ Church Music Society.

The choir, which broadcasts regularly, have many recordings to their credit and were the subject of a Channel 4 television documentary Howard Goodall's Great Dates (2002). The documentary was nominated at the Montreux TV Festival in the arts programme category - and has since been seen internationally. The choir's collaboration with Goodall has also led to their singing his TV themes for Mr. Bean and Vicar of Dibley. They appeared in Howard Goodall's Big Bangs, broadcast in the United Kingdom on Channel 4 in March 2000. Treasures of Christ Church (2011) is an example of the choir's recording and debuted as the highest new entry in the UK Specialist Classical chart. The disc featured on BBC Radio 3's In Tune on 26 September 2011 and on Radio 3's Breakfast Show on 27 September that year.

Picture gallery

Christ Church holds one of the most important private collections of drawings in the UK, including works by Leonardo da Vinci, Raphael and Michelangelo. The collection is composed of approximately 300 paintings and 2,000 drawings, a rotated selection of which are available to the public for viewing in the purpose-built Christ Church Picture Gallery. Many of the works were bequeathed by a former member of the college, General John Guise (1682/3-1765), enabling the creation of the first public art gallery in Britain.

Coat of arms

College arms

The college arms are those of Cardinal Wolsey and were granted to him by the College of Arms on 4 August 1525. They are blazoned: Sable, on a cross engrailed argent, between four leopards' faces azure a lion passant gules; on a chief or between two Cornish choughs proper a rose gules barbed vert and seeded or. The arms are depicted beneath a red cardinal's galero with fifteen tassels on either side, and sometimes in front of two crossed croziers.

Cathedral arms
There are also arms in use by the cathedral, which were confirmed in a visitation of 1574. They are emblazoned: "Between quarterly, 1st & 4th, France modern (azure three fleurs-de-lys or), 2nd & 3rd, England (gules in pale three lions passant guardant or), on a cross argent an open Bible proper edged and bound with seven clasps or, inscribed with the words  and imperially crowned or."

Graces

The college preprandial grace reads:

The first part of the grace is read by a scholar or exhibitioner before formal hall each evening, ending with the words Per Iēsum Christum Dominum nostrum ("Through Jesus Christ our Lord.") The remainder of the grace, replacing Per Iēsum Christum etc., is usually only read on special occasions.

There is also a long postprandial grace intended for use after meals, but this is rarely used. When High Table rises (by which time the Hall is largely empty), the senior member on High Table simply says Benedictō benedīcātur ("Let the Blessed One be blessed", or "Let a blessing be given by the Blessed One"), instead of the college postprandial grace.

Student life

As well as rooms for accommodation, the buildings of Christ Church include the cathedral, one of the smallest in England, which also acts as the college chapel, a great hall, two libraries, two bars, and separate common rooms for dons, graduates and undergraduates. There are also gardens and a neighbouring sports ground and boat-house.

Accommodation is usually provided for all undergraduates, and for some graduates, although some accommodation is off-site. Accommodation is generally spacious with most rooms equipped with sinks and fridges. Many undergraduate rooms comprise 'sets' of bedrooms and living areas. Members are generally expected to dine in hall, where there are two sittings every evening, one informal and one formal (where gowns must be worn and Latin grace is read). The college offers subsidies on the costs of accommodation and dinners for UK and ROI students from families with lower household incomes. The buttery next to the Hall serves drinks around dinner time. There is also a college bar (known as the Undercroft), as well as a Junior Common Room (JCR) and a Graduate Common Room (GCR), equivalent to the Middle Common Room (MCR) in other colleges.

There is a college lending library that supplements the university libraries (many of which are non-lending). Law students have the additional facility of the Burn Law Library, named for Edward Burn. Most undergraduate tutorials are carried out in the college, though for some specialist subjects undergraduates may be sent to tutors in other colleges.

Croquet is played in the Masters' Garden in the summer. The sports ground is mainly used for netball, cricket, tennis, rugby and football and includes Christ Church cricket ground. In recent years the Christ Church Netball Club, which competes on the inter-college level in both mixed and women's matches, has become known as a popular and inclusive sport. Rowing and punting is carried out by the boat-house across Christ Church Meadow - the Christ Church Boat Club is traditionally strong at rowing, having been Head of the River more than all other colleges except Oriel College. The college also owns its own punts which may be borrowed by students or dons.

The college beagle pack (Christ Church and Farley Hill Beagles), which was formerly one of several undergraduate packs in Oxford, is no longer formally connected with the college or the university but continues to be staffed and followed by some Oxford undergraduates.

Christ Church references

Also included in: Vaughan Williams|An Oxford Elegy (1947-9).

People associated with the college

Deans
Cardinal College
1525: John Hygdon

King Henry VIII's College
1532: John Hygdon
1533: John Oliver

Christ Church

Alumni

Notable former students of the college have included politicians, scientists, philosophers, entertainers and academics. Thirteen British prime ministers have studied at the college including, Anthony Eden (Prime Minister 1955–1957), William Ewart Gladstone (1828–1831), Sir Robert Peel (1841–1846) and Archibald Primrose (1894–1895). Other former students include Charles Abbot (Speaker of the House of Commons 1802–1817), Frederick Curzon (Conservative Party statesman 1951–), Nicholas Lyell (Attorney General 1992–1997), Nigel Lawson (Chancellor of the Exchequer 1983–1989), Quintin Hogg (Lord Chancellor 1979–1987) and William Murray (Lord Chief Justice 1756–1788 and Chancellor of the Exchequer 1757). From outside the UK, politicians from Canada (Ted Jolliffe), Pakistan (Zulfikar Ali Bhutto) and the United States (Charles Cotesworth Pinckney) have attended the college.

Prominent philosophers including John Locke, John Rawls, A. J. Ayer, Gilbert Ryle, Michael Dummett, John Searle and Daniel Dennett studied at Christ Church.

There are numerous former students in the fields of academia and theology, including George Kitchin (the first Chancellor of the University of Durham 1908–1912 and Dean of Durham Cathedral 1894–1912), John Charles Ryle (first Bishop of Liverpool 1880–1900), John Wesley (leader of the Methodist movement), Rowan Williams (Archbishop of Canterbury 2002–2012), Richard William Jelf (Principal of King's College London 1843–1868), Ronald Montagu Burrows (Principal of King's College London 1913–1920) and William Stubbs (Bishop of Oxford 1889–1901 and historian).

Two Olympic rowing gold medallists studied at the college: Jonny Searle and Spanish Civil War volunteer Lewis Clive.

In the sciences, polymath and natural philosopher Robert Hooke, developmental biologist John B. Gurdon (co-winner of the 2012 Nobel Prize in Physiology or Medicine), physician Sir Archibald Edward Garrod, the Father of Modern Medicine Sir William Osler, biochemist Kenneth Callow, radio astronomer Sir Martin Ryle, psychologist Edward de Bono and epidemiologist Sir Richard Doll are all associated with the college.   Albert Einstein was a learned research fellow.

In other fields, Cameron and Tyler Winklevoss, twins associated with the founding of Facebook, King Edward VII (1841–1910), King of the United Kingdom and Emperor of India, King William II of the Netherlands, Prince Paul of Yugoslavia, entrepreneur and founder of Pennsylvania William Penn, broadcaster David Dimbleby, MP Louise Mensch, BBC composer Howard Goodall, actor Riz Ahmed, the writer Lewis Carroll, poet W. H. Auden, and the former officer of arms Hubert Chesshyre are other notable students to have previously studied at Christ Church.

Gallery

Notes

References

External links

 
 Oxford Cathedral
 Christ Church Junior Common Room website
 Christ Church Graduate Common Room website
 Christ Church Boat Club
 Official Virtual Tour of Christ Church 
 Christ Church Choir

 
Colleges of the University of Oxford
Educational institutions established in the 1540s
Grade I listed buildings in Oxford
Grade I listed educational buildings
Augustinian monasteries in England
Buildings and structures of the University of Oxford
1546 establishments in England
Grade I listed parks and gardens in Oxfordshire